Ivan Vidmajer (born 24 December 1949) is a Slovenian judoka. He competed in the men's lightweight event at the 1976 Summer Olympics, representing Yugoslavia.

References

1949 births
Living people
Slovenian male judoka
Olympic judoka of Yugoslavia
Judoka at the 1976 Summer Olympics
People from Slovenska Bistrica